The Louis N. Hilger Homestead/Livestock Barn is a historic barn in rural northern White County, Arkansas.  It is located on the south side of County Road 374 (Warren Road), west of Providence.  It is a two-story wood-frame structure, with a gambrel roof, hay hood, board-and-batten siding, and a concrete foundation.  It has a transverse crib layout, with a livestock shed extending along one side.  It has two shed-roof dormers on the east side, providing light to the interior.  It was built in 1939 to house mules used as draught animals for the Hilger dairy operation, and is distinctive within the county for its use of dormers and its extraordinary height, made possible by its braced-frame construction.

The barn was listed on the National Register of Historic Places in 1992.

See also
National Register of Historic Places listings in White County, Arkansas

References

Barns on the National Register of Historic Places in Arkansas
Buildings and structures in White County, Arkansas
National Register of Historic Places in White County, Arkansas
Barns with hay hoods